Todd Michael Hall (born September 27, 1969, in Saginaw, Michigan) is an American musician best known as the lead singer for New York-based band Riot V.

Life 
He has been in the band since 2013 and is their fifth official singer. Hall has also sung in many other metal bands including Reverence, Jack Starr's Burning Starr, Entice and Harlet.

Todd was a contestant on Season 18 of The Voice.

Todd is married to Lumpeny after a long-distance relationship. They have three children together.

Discography

With Harlet 
 Virgin Wings (EP, 1987)
 25 Gets a Ride (1988)

With Pulling Teeth 
 Pulling Teeth (1994)

With Jack Starr's Burning Starr 
 Defiance (2009)
 Land of the Dead (2011)
 Stand Your Ground (2017)

With Reverence 
 When Darkness Calls (2012)
 Gods of War (2015)

With Riot V 
 Unleash the Fire (2014)
 Armor of Light (2018)

With Avalon 
 Return to Eden (2019)

Solo 
 Letters from India (2017)
 Earth (EP, 2019)
 Air (EP, 2019)
 Fire (EP, 2019)
 Water (EP, 2019)
 Sonic Healing (2021)

References 

 https://www.blabbermouth.net/news/riot-v-singer-todd-michael-hall-releases-overdrive-music-video-feat-metal-church-guitarist-kurdt-vanderhoof/
 https://www.metal-archives.com/artists/Todd_Michael_Hall/126692/

American heavy metal singers
People from Saginaw, Michigan
20th-century American singers
21st-century American singers
1969 births
Living people
Riot (band) members
20th-century American male singers
21st-century American male singers
Singers from Michigan
University of Michigan alumni
The Voice (franchise) contestants